Xenia Staffelbach (born 16 March 1998) is a Swiss volleyball player. 
She is a member of the Women's National Team.
She participated at the 2017 Montreux Volley Masters, 2018 Montreux Volley Masters. 
She plays for Viteos NUC .

Clubs 

  Viteos NUC (2017-2021)

References

External links 
 FIVB Profile
 

1998 births
Living people
Swiss women's volleyball players
Place of birth missing (living people)